Kurigram-2 is a constituency represented in the Jatiya Sangsad (National Parliament) of Bangladesh since 2019 by Ponir Uddin Ahmed of the Jatiya Party (Ershad)

Boundaries 
The constituency encompasses Kurigram Sadar, Phulbari, and Rajarhat upazilas.

History 
The constituency was created in 1984 from the Rangpur-14 constituency when the former Rangpur District was split into five districts: Nilphamari, Lalmonirhat, Rangpur, Kurigram, and Gaibandha.

Ahead of the 2008 general election, the Election Commission redrew constituency boundaries to reflect population changes revealed by the 2001 Bangladesh census. The 2008 redistricting altered the boundaries of the constituency.

Ahead of the 2014 general election, the Election Commission expanded the boundaries of the constituency. Previously it excluded four union parishads of Rajarhat Upazila: Bidyananda, Gharialdanga, Nazimkhan, and Omar Majid.

Members of Parliament

Elections

Elections in the 2010s 
Md. Tajul Islam Choudhury was elected unopposed in the 2014 general election after opposition parties withdrew their candidacies in a boycott of the election.

Elections in the 2000s 
Hussain Muhammad Ershad stood for three seats in the 2008 general election: Rangpur-3, Kurigram-2, and Dhaka-17. After winning all three, he chose to represent Dhaka-17 and quit the other two, triggering by-elections in them. Zafar Ali of the Awami League was elected in an April 2009 by-election.

Elections in the 1990s

References

External links
 

Parliamentary constituencies in Bangladesh
Kurigram District